Dorsum Zirkel is a wrinkle ridge at  northeast of Mons La Hire in Mare Imbrium on the Moon. It is 193 km long and was named after German geologist Ferdinand Zirkel in 1976.

Two small craters, La Hire A and B, lie on either side of the dorsum.  The large crater Lambert is to the southeast, and the smaller McDonald is to the northeast.

References

External links

Ridges on the Moon
Mare Imbrium